The president of the Minnesota Senate is the presiding officer of the Minnesota Senate. Until 1973, the Lieutenant Governor of Minnesota served as the Senate president. Since then, presidents have been elected by the body, usually at the nomination of the majority.

While power within the Senate lies primarily with the Minnesota Senate Majority Leader, the president of the Senate does succeed to lieutenant governor in the event that office becomes vacant, something which happened most recently in 2018.

From statehood until 1973, the Lieutenant Governor served as president. Not all lieutenant governors served at the same time as the Senate was in session. Those who served as President were:

Beginning in 1973, the Minnesota Senate began electing its own presidents. Those who have served since 1973 are:

1In accordance with the Minnesota Constitution, Fischbach automatically became Lieutenant Governor of Minnesota on January 3, 2018, after previous Lt. Gov. Tina Smith resigned to accept an appointment to the United States Senate. Fischbach formally resigned from the Minnesota Senate on May 25, 2018. As the Senate did not meet during this time, the position was vacant until Jeremy Miller was formally elected in January 2019.

Notes on Minnesota political party names 
Minnesota Democratic-Farmer-Labor Party: On April 15, 1944 the state Democratic Party and the Minnesota Farmer-Labor Party merged and created the Minnesota Democratic-Farmer-Labor Party (DFL). It is affiliated with the national Democratic Party.

References

Minnesota Senate President and President Pro Tempore, 1849-